György Mizsei (born November 30, 1971 in Kiskunfélegyháza) is a former professional Hungarian boxer, who won a bronze medal in the light middleweight division at the 1992 Summer Olympics.

He gained the bronze medal at the 1996 European Amateur Boxing Championships in Vejle, Denmark. His son (György Jr.) also professional boxer who won EBU European Union lightweight title in 2014.

Amateur Highlights
 1991 bronze medalist in European Amateur Boxing Championships in Göteborg, Sweden
 1996 bronze medalist in European Amateur Boxing Championships in Vejle, Denmark
 Representing Hungary, won the Light Middleweight bronze medal at the 1992 Olympics in Barcelona
 Member of the Hungarian Olympic Team of Atlanta in Light Middleweights
1992 Olympic Results - Boxed as a Light Middleweight (71 kg)
1st Round - Defeated Fabrizio de Chiara of Italy, 13:4
Round of 16 - Defeated Hendrik Simangunsong of Indonesia, 17:5
Quarterfinals - Defeated Maselino Masoe of American Samoa, 17:3
Semifinals - Lost to Juan Carlos Lemus of Cuba, 2:10
1996 Olympic Results - Boxed as a Light Middleweight (71 kg)
1st Round - Defeated Richard Rowles of Australia, 10:2
Round of 16 - Lost to Markus Beyer of Germany, 6:14

Pro career
In 1997 Mizsei began his professional career, and he had limited success as a pro.  After two fights, including a loss to future titlist Armand Krajnc, Mizsei retired with a record of 1-1-0.
After more than nine years layoff, Mizsei reactivated his pro career.

References

External links
 

1971 births
Living people
People from Kiskunfélegyháza
Boxers at the 1992 Summer Olympics
Boxers at the 1996 Summer Olympics
Olympic boxers of Hungary
Olympic bronze medalists for Hungary
Olympic medalists in boxing
Hungarian male boxers
Medalists at the 1992 Summer Olympics
Light-middleweight boxers
Sportspeople from Bács-Kiskun County